Scrobipalpa vasconiella is a moth in the family Gelechiidae. It was described by Rössler in 1877. It is found on the Canary Islands and Madeira, as well as in Algeria, Portugal, Spain, southern France, Sardinia, Sicily, Italy, former Yugoslavia, Greece, south-western Russia and Turkey.

The dark fields of scales form a mosaic pattern on the forewings, which have a brown-reddish ground colour. The tip of the forewing is dark. The hindwings are light to dark dirty grey.

References

Scrobipalpa
Moths described in 1877